Harris Branch may refer to:

Harris Branch (Brazil Creek), a stream in Missouri
Harris Branch (Flat River), a stream in Missouri